The Ohio nuclear bribery scandal (2020) is a political scandal in Ohio involving allegations that electric utility company FirstEnergy paid roughly $60 million to Generation Now, a 501(c)(4) organization purportedly controlled by Speaker of the Ohio House of Representatives Larry Householder, in exchange for passing a $1.3 billion bailout for the nuclear power operator. It was described as "likely the largest bribery, money laundering scheme ever perpetrated against the people of the state of Ohio" by U.S. Attorney David M. DeVillers, who charged Householder and four others with racketeering on July 21, 2020. According to prosecutors, FirstEnergy poured millions into the campaigns of 21 candidates during the 2018 Ohio House of Representatives election, which ultimately helped Householder replace Ryan Smith as Republican House speaker.

Background 
In July 2019, the House passed House Bill 6, which increased electricity rates and provided that money as a $150 million per year subsidy for the Perry and Davis–Besse nuclear plants, subsidized coal-fired power plants, and reduced subsidies for renewable energy and energy efficiency. Governor Mike DeWine signed the bill the day it passed. This bill was described as the "worst legislation yet" among bills that subsidize fossil fuels by Leah Stokes, and the "worst energy bill of the 21st century" by David Roberts of Vox.

Even before the bribery scandal came to light, the financial connections between Larry Householder and FirstEnergy were public knowledge. In addition, Householder and his son flew on a corporate jet owned by FirstEnergy to attend the Inauguration of Donald Trump.

Consumer advocates and the natural gas industry tried to place a ballot initiative on the 2020 ballot to overturn the law, but were unsuccessful due to negative campaigning by Generation Now.

Reactions 
Governor Mike DeWine asked Householder to resign, as did former Governor John Kasich who previously opposed H.B. 6, but Householder refused. Republican legislator Jamie Callender, who had sponsored the bill, claimed no knowledge of the scheme and said that he felt "betrayed".

Democratic U.S. Senator Sherrod Brown also joined the prominent voices calling for Householder's resignation, and additionally blamed the scandal on Republican one-party rule in Ohio state politics.

DeWine had earlier resisted calls to repeal H.B. 6, but changed his mind on July 23, stating: "No matter how good this policy is, the process by which this bill was passed is simply not acceptable. That process, I believe, has forever tainted the bill and now the law itself." DeWine urged the House to quickly select a new speaker in order to pass a replacement bill.

The scandal, which occurred during a presidential election campaign, led to speculation about whether it could lead Joe Biden to win the state.  Biden ultimately lost Ohio to Trump by 53.3% to 45.2%.

On June 16, 2021, members of the Ohio House of Representatives voted to remove Larry Householder from the House. The seat representing the 72nd House District was filled by Kevin D. Miller, a former State Highway Patrolman.

A year after the news officially broke about the scandal, on July 22, 2021, the U.S. Attorney for the Southern District of Ohio announced that FirstEnergy would be fined $230 million for their part in it. Vipal Patel, the acting U.S. Attorney, said that this was the largest criminal fine ever collected by the Southern District. On Dec 30, 2022 FirstEnergy agreed to pay a civil penalty of $3,860,000 to the United States Treasury

Notes

References 

Bribery scandals
Political scandals in Ohio
Nuclear power in the United States
2020 scandals